Kunstmuseum is a German word literally translated into English as "art museum". It may refer to:

 KUNSTEN Museum of Modern Art Aalborg, art museum in Aalborg, Denmark
 Kunstmuseum Basel, the largest art museum in Basel, Switzerland
 Kunstmuseum Bayreuth, art museum in Bayreuth, Germany
 Kunstmuseum Bern, art museum in Bern, Switzerland
 Kunstmuseum Bonn, modern art museum in Bonn, Germany
 Kunstmuseum Den Haag, art museum in The Hague, the Netherlands
 Kunstmuseum Düsseldorf, original name (until 2001) of the Museum Kunstpalast in Düsseldorf, Germany
 Kunstmuseum Liechtenstein, the national art museum of Liechtenstein
 Kunstmuseum St. Gallen, art museum in St. Gallen, Switzerland
 Kunstmuseum Solothurn, art museum in Solothurn, Switzerland
 Kunstmuseum Stuttgart, contemporary art museum in Stuttgart, Germany
 Kunstmuseum Winterthur, art museum in Winterthur, Switzerland
 Kunstmuseum Wolfsburg, art museum in Wolfsburg, Germany

See also:
 Kunsthalle